The Conquérant was originally launched in 1746 on a design by François Coulomb the Younger. She was taken out of service in March 1764 and rebuilt at Brest as a  74-gun ship of the line of the French Navy.

Career 
In 1778, Conquérant was under Monteil, part of the Third division in the Blue squadron of the fleet under Orvilliers. She took part in the Battle of Ushant on 27 July 1778, where Monteil was wounded.

On 2 May 1780, she departed Brest with the 7-ship and 3-frigate Expédition Particulière under Admiral Ternay, escorting 36 transports carrying troops to support the Continental Army in the War of American Independence. The squadron comprised the 80-gun Duc de Bourgogne, under Ternay d'Arsac (admiral) and Médine (flag captain); the 74-gun Neptune, under Sochet Des Touches, and Conquérant, under La Grandière; and the 64-gun Provence under Lombard, Ardent under Bernard de Marigny, Jason under La Clocheterie and Éveillé under Le Gardeur de Tilly, and the frigates Surveillante under Villeneuve Cillart, Amazone under La Pérouse, and Bellone. Amazone, which constituted the vanguard of the fleet, arrived at Boston on 11 June 1780.

She took part in the Battle of the Nile, where she was armed with only 18- and 12-pounders, and crewed by a mere 400 men, under captain Dalbarade. Second ship in the vanguard of her line, Conquérant sustained fire from the passing British ships sailing to attack the centre of the French fleet. She was particularly targeted by HMS Audacious and Goliath, who reduced her to a hulk before 19:00. Immobilised, hopelessly overgunned and undermanned, her captain mortally wounded, Conquérant struck her colours and was seized by a boarding party from Audacious.

She was subsequently recommissioned in the Royal Navy under the same name.

Notes, citations, and references 
Notes

Citations

Bibliography
 
 
 
 
 

 External links
Naval Database 

Ships of the line of the French Navy
Citoyen-class ships of the line
1746 ships